Harry Charles Wright (October 4, 1919 – March 9, 1993) was an American football player and coach. He played college football at the University of Notre Dame, quarterbacking the 1941 Notre Dame Fighting Irish football team to an undefeated record. Wright served as the head football coach at the University of Portland in 1949 and the United States Merchant Marine Academy from 1958 to 1963, compiling a career college football coaching record of 35–28–1. He also worked an assistant coach for the New York Giants of the National Football League (NFL) from 1964 to 1966 under head coach Allie Sherman. Wright was later the mayor of Sparta Township, New Jersey.

References

1919 births
1993 deaths
American football quarterbacks
Merchant Marine Mariners football coaches
New York Giants coaches
Notre Dame Fighting Irish football players
Portland Pilots athletic directors
Portland Pilots football coaches
High school football coaches in New York (state)
Players of American football from New York City
People from Sparta, New Jersey
Mayors of places in New Jersey